Don Bessillieu (born May 4, 1956) is a former National Football League safety for the Miami Dolphins, the St. Louis Cardinals, and the Los Angeles Raiders. He also played in the United States Football League. He played collegiately at Georgia Tech.

References

1956 births
Living people
American football safeties
Georgia Tech Yellow Jackets football players
Miami Dolphins players
St. Louis Cardinals (football) players
Los Angeles Raiders players
Jacksonville Bulls players
Memphis Showboats players
Players of American football from Columbus, Georgia